Leptodactylus lithonaetes is a species of frog in the family Leptodactylidae.  

It is found in Colombia, Venezuela, and possibly Brazil. Its natural habitats are subtropical or tropical moist lowland forests, moist savanna, rivers, and rocky areas. It is not considered threatened by the IUCN.

References

lithonaetes
Amphibians of Colombia
Amphibians of Venezuela
Amphibians described in 1995
Taxonomy articles created by Polbot